Colby Lake is a lake in Washington County, in the U.S. state of Minnesota.

Colby Lake was named for John Colby, an early settler turned county official.

A 2-mile paved trail circumnavigates the lake, which is a popular recreational destination.

See also
List of lakes in Minnesota

References

Lakes of Minnesota
Lakes of Washington County, Minnesota